Golden shower is slang for the practice of urinating on another person for sexual pleasure, as part of urolagnia.

Golden shower may also refer to:

 Golden Shower (band), a Brazilian duo
 Golden shower orchid, a common name for Oncidim
 Golden shower tree, a common name for the ornamental tree Cassia fistula
 The Golden Shower, a 1919 American silent film directed by John W. Noble
 "Golden Shower", a song by German/Swedish industrial metal supergroup Lindemann
 "Golden Showers", a song by shock rock band The Mentors